Munich-Westkreuz (literally "Munich West Cross") is a railway station in the Pasing district of Munich.

The station is located at the junction of the Munich–Garmisch-Partenkirchen and Munich–Herrsching railways.

References

Westkreuz
Westkreuz
Railway stations in Germany opened in 1970